Buquetia is a genus of flies in the family Tachinidae.

Species
Buquetia hilaris (Baranov, 1939)
Buquetia musca Robineau-Desvoidy, 1847
Buquetia obscura (Coquillett, 1897)

References

Tachinidae genera
Exoristinae
Taxa named by Jean-Baptiste Robineau-Desvoidy
Diptera of Europe
Diptera of Asia
Diptera of North America